Zoorama is an American television show that focused on wildlife and nature. The program was filmed at the San Diego Zoo and was produced between 1955 and 1970.

Zoorama was originally created for the local television market in San Diego, California, and it was picked up for national broadcast on CBS before being sold as a syndicated series. For most of its run, the series was hosted by San Diego television reporter Bob Dale.

References

1955 American television series debuts
1970 American television series endings
1950s American documentary television series
1960s American documentary television series
1970s American documentary television series
Television series about animals
First-run syndicated television programs in the United States
English-language television shows